United States Cellular Corporation (doing business as UScellular) is an American mobile network operator. It is a subsidiary of Telephone and Data Systems Inc. (which owns an 84% stake). The company was formed in 1983 and is headquartered in Chicago, Illinois. UScellular is the fifth-largest wireless carrier in the United States, with 4,740,000 subscribers in 426 markets in 23 states as of the third quarter of 2022. It was previously known as United States Cellular and U.S. Cellular.

Timeline

1980s & 1990s 
United States Cellular was founded as a subsidiary of Telephone and Data Systems Inc. (TDS) and incorporated on December 23, 1983. In 1985, the company began operations in Knoxville, Tennessee (June), and Tulsa, Oklahoma (August). Don Nelson was named the first president in 1987 and TDS took the company public in 1988 where United States Cellular adopted USM as its ticker symbol on the American Stock Exchange. In 1999, United States Cellular relaunched under the “U.S. Cellular” brand name and image across all markets nationwide.

2000s 
Don Nelson retired and Jack Rooney took over as CEO. In 2001, U.S. Cellular received the Wireless Titan Award as the top wireless carrier in terms of customer service from Wireless Review magazine. The company purchased PrimeCo Wireless Communications in 2002 and launched in the Chicago area on November 22. It built on this growth by signing Chicagoan Joan Cusack as national spokesperson. In January 2003, U.S. Cellular acquired naming rights to the baseball stadium used by the Chicago White Sox. Formerly known as Comiskey Park, the stadium was officially renamed U.S Cellular Field (it was renamed Guaranteed Rate Field in 2016). That same year, U.S. Cellular and Cingular (now owned by AT&T Mobility) exchanged wireless assets and U.S. Cellular received new spectrum in markets of 13 states that were adjacent to or overlapped existing operations in exchange for its Georgia and northern Florida licenses. U.S. Cellular also launched Easyedge, its suite of wireless data services. In 2005, U.S. Cellular entered the St. Louis market, making it the second largest market U.S. Cellular served, after Chicago. In October of 2008, U.S. Cellular launched Mobile Broadband, a service enabling customers to access data on its cell phones 10 times faster than before. It brought DSL-like service and capabilities to customers through EVDO (Evolution-Data Optimized) technology, commonly referred to as 3G. As of Q2 2008, U.S. Cellular was preparing to roll out 3G/EVDO revision A to select markets.

2010s 
In 2010 CEO Jack Rooney retired and Mary N. Dillon assumed the position of CEO. In May of 2011, U.S. Cellular announced that it will offer 4G LTE. In a surprising move, U.S. Cellular announced the sale of several markets to Sprint Corporation including Chicago. Mary Dillon departed as CEO in 2013 and Kenneth R. Meyers took over. June of 2016, Google announced that it partnered with U.S. Cellular as part of its Google Fi service. U.S. Cellular contributed its network and LTE service to the "network of networks" along with T-Mobile US and Sprint Corporation.

2020s 
In March of 2020, U.S. Cellular debuted launch of 5G in Wisconsin and Iowa and Laurent Therivel was selected to succeed retiring Kenneth R. Meyers as CEO in June. At the end of the third quarter, U.S. Cellular rebranded as UScellular and upgraded its logo.

Network

CDMA/3G network
Originally, U.S. Cellular used analog, then Digital AMPS "TDMA" cell phones in most markets, but the company started shifting to 1xRTT CDMA technology in 2003. After the switch, U.S. Cellular discontinued all analog and TDMA services. Starting in 2009, U.S. Cellular converted its network to EVDO, which offered 3G speeds.

4G LTE network
U.S. Cellular began offering 4G LTE coverage to customers in the first quarter of 2012. The rollout started in cities in Iowa, Wisconsin, Maine, North Carolina, Texas and Oklahoma. In 2012, U.S. Cellular added 4G LTE in additional markets throughout the country.

Its LTE network was primarily built upon two low-frequency LTE bands; 12 and 5. Through an agreement with King Street Wireless, U.S. Cellular has access to the lower 700 MHz A, B, and C blocks across most of its  markets. Spectrum bandwidth includes, 5*5, or 10*10 MHz on band 12 700 MHz 5*5 MHz on band 5 850 MHz 5*5, or 10*10 MHz on band 4 AWS 1. U.S. Cellular also has 5Mhz or 10Mhz of spectrum on Band 66 (AWS-3) in some markets.

The company began VoLTE trials during 2016, launched its first market with VoLTE during the first quarter of 2017.

In December 2019, the FCC found U.S. Cellular shared misinformation about its 4G LTE coverage by as much as 38%, only managing to reach the federally mandated minimum speeds 45% of the time.

5G network 
In June 2019, U.S. Cellular successfully bid for high frequency spectrum in the Federal Communications Commission’s (FCC) Millimeter Wave Spectrum Auctions and purchased licenses covering 98 percent of its subscribers for $256.0 million or 1.7 cents per MHz pop. This laid the foundation for October 2019, when U.S. Cellular officially announced plans to launch its 5G service. The company launched its first phone with support, the Samsung Galaxy S20, as well as coverage maps for its first commercial 5G network in both urban and rural parts of Iowa and Wisconsin in February 2020.

Nationwide Coverage Through Roaming

UScellular has roaming agreements with AT&T Mobility, T-Mobile U.S. and Verizon. This allows customers to roam on these networks with LTE or 5G speeds with no extra charges.

Radio frequency summary

The following is a list of known CDMA, LTE, and 5G NR frequency bands which UScellular employs in the United States:

Community Involvement 
Since 2009, UScellular has donated nearly $22.6 million along with countless experiences and technology items to nonprofit organizations across the country in three areas: STEM Learning, Bridging the Digital Divide and Celebrating Associate Passions/Local Communities.

STEM Learning 
In March of 2021, UScellular donated $150,000 to Girls Who Code to open five new Girls Who Code clubs in Kansas, Oklahoma, Virginia and Maine to help increase access to future opportunities, especially among young women. 

The company made a $100,000 DonorsChoose donation in 2021 for to provide STEM learning support for 500 teachers and 50,000 students.

Bridging the Digital Divide 
In 2021, USCellular launched the After School Access Project with a pledge to provide up to $13 million in hotspots and service in 2022 to help up to 50,000 youth get connected.

In August 2022, the company is donated $4.7 million in wireless hotspots and service to 17 YWCA locations and 16,000 YWCA members across the country to help youth access the connectivity they need outside of the classroom.

Celebrating Associate Passions/Local Communities 
UScellular associates participated in 3,800 volunteer experiences and the company matched $296,000 in personal donations for 2021.

In 2021, UScellular donated $40,000 to Red Cross disaster support, recycled and repurposed 187,000 devices and avoided 238 million gallons of water pollution.

USCellular has donated $1 million annually to the Boys & Girls Clubs of America since 2016.

 Annual Black History Month Art Contest with Boys & Girls Clubs:
 Since 2008, UScellular has sponsored the Black History Month Art Contest. The contest started with Boys & Girls Clubs of Southwest Virginia in 2008 and has grown over the years to include 30 Clubs across the country in 2022.

 Annual Hispanic Heritage Month Art Contest with Boys & Girls Clubs
 In 2021, UScellular, with the Boys & Girls Clubs of America debuted the Hispanic Heritage Month Art Contest. The top three vote-getters from each Boys & Girls Club receive prizes that include $250 for first place, $150 for second and $100 for third.

Corporate sponsorship 
UScellular owns the naming rights to:
 UScellular Soccer Complex, in Knoxville, Tennessee
 UScellular Connection Stage at Summerfest in Milwaukee, Wisconsin
Current Sponsorships:

 Presenting Sponsor of the Wisconsin State Fair
 Official Wireless Sponsor of the Milwaukee Brewers since 2008
 Official Wireless Partner of the Green Bay Packers since 2018 

Official Wireless Provider and proud partner of:

 Iowa Hawkeyes (University of Iowa)
 Iowa State Cyclones (Iowa State University)
 WVU Mountaineers (West Virginia University)
 UMaine Black Bears (University of Maine)

The company formerly owned the naming rights to:
 U.S. Cellular Center in Cedar Rapids, Iowa – now Alliant Energy PowerHouse
 U.S. Cellular Grandstand at the Kansas State Fairgrounds in Hutchinson, Kansas – now Nex-Tech Wireless Grandstand
 U.S. Cellular Arena in Milwaukee – now UW–Milwaukee Panther Arena
 U.S. Cellular Field in Chicago – now Guaranteed Rate Field
 U.S. Cellular Center in Asheville, North Carolina – now Harrah's Cherokee Center
 U.S. Cellular Community Park in Medford, Oregon – now Lithia & Driveway Fields
UScellular had served as the presenting sponsor of the 80/35 Music Festival in Des Moines, Iowa. It also served as the title sponsor of a NASCAR Xfinity Series race until 2019, the U.S. Cellular 250, at Iowa Speedway in Newton, Iowa.

Sound logo
The sonic logo, tag, audio mnemonic was produced by Musikvergnuegen and written by Walter Werzowa from the Austrian 1980s sampling band Edelweiss.

References

External links
 

Companies based in Chicago
Companies listed on the New York Stock Exchange
Mobile phone companies of the United States
Telecommunications companies established in 1983
Telecommunications companies of the United States